Katrine Michelsen (21 January 1966 – 17 January 2009) was a Danish model and actress.

Career 
Michelsen's first role as an actress was a small role in Cyklen, a project film at the Danish film academy. Shortly after school she got a role in a TV play by Franz Ernst and Astrid Saalbach. In the play, she is a strong and politically committed woman.

This gave her roles in two horror films and two erotic films in Italy from 1986. In La Bonne by Salvatore Samperi, Trine Michelsen is a maid who arouses the inhabitants of a house erotically. The film was a success in Italy. The following year came Sergio Bergonzelli's  which was even more erotic. Her last Italian film was the 1987 thriller Le foto di Gioia by Lamberto Bava.

Her only American film came in 1988 in a small role in The Girl in a Swing, Gordon Hessler's adaptation of Richard Adams' novel by the same name. Lack of success made her focus on her modelling career, but she returned to acting in 1994 playing a prostitute in 's unemployment drama Eva. In 1998 she was the most nude collectivist in Lars von Trier's Dogme-film The Idiots.

Personal life 
Michelsen was the daughter of journalist and author Ole Michelsen and his wife Nina Varberg, who died in a car accident four years after Trine's birth. She was without contact with her father for years until they were reconciled in the 1990s.

In April 2005, she told publicly that she had cancer. In December, it had spread to most of her body. Michelsen died 17 January 2009 in a nursing home in Emdrup. She was buried at Frederiksberg Church.

Film 
 La Bonne (1986)
  (1987)
 Spettri (1987)
 Le foto di Gioia (1987)
 The Girl on a Swing (1988)
 Trines fantasier (1994)
 The Idiots (1998)
  (1998)
  (1999)

Tv-series 
 En verden der blegner (1984)
 Eva (1994)

Referencer 

1966 births
2009 deaths
Danish actresses